The Villa Nava Rusconi is a Neoclassical-style, rural palace located within the town limits of Monticello Brianza, Province of Lecco, region of Lombardy, Italy.

History
The villa was erected in 1820 with design by Luigi Canonica. The façade has monumental ionic pilasters arising from the Piano Nobile and two flanking wings extend forward. The rear has a large public garden. The interiors include a large oval salon.

References

Villas in Lombardy
Gardens in Lombardy
Buildings and structures in Lombardy
Neoclassical architecture in Lombardy